Acanthesthes amycteroides is a species of beetle in the family Cerambycidae. It was described by White in 1858. It is known from South Africa.

The junior synonym A. spinosa's type location is Port Natal and its initial description listed a length of 21 mm and a width of 9 mm.

References

Phantasini
Beetles described in 1858